General elections were held in Malawi on 20 May 2004 to elect a President and the National Assembly. The election had originally been scheduled for 18 May but was postponed for two days in response to opposition complaints of irregularities in the voter roll. By 22 May no results had been announced, leading to protests from the opposition and threats of disorder. On 25 May the Malawi Electoral Commission finally announced the results of the election. Bingu wa Mutharika, the candidate of the ruling United Democratic Front, was declared the winner of the presidential poll, whilst the Malawi Congress Party had won most seats in the National Assembly vote. Voter turnout was around 62%.

Campaign

President
There were five candidates for the presidential election:
Gwanda Chakuamba, aged 69, was the candidate of a seven-party opposition coalition, the Mgwirizano Coalition or Unity Coalition. Chakuamba has a colourful past, having been a senior minister and militia commander under former President-for-life Hastings Banda. In 1980 he fell out with Banda, whose assassination he was accused of plotting. He spent 12 years in prison and emerged a popular hero, then succeeded Banda as leader of his party, the Malawi Congress Party. 
Justin Malewezi,  Vice-President of Malawi under Bakili Muluzi, stood as the candidate of the People's Progressive Movement, having been passed over by the ruling party.
Brown Mpinganjira, aged 55, was the candidate of the National Democratic Alliance, a breakaway group from the ruling party.
John Tembo, aged 72, was the candidate of the Malawi Congress Party.
Bingu wa Mutharika, a 70-year-old economist and veteran politician who was the candidate of the ruling United Democratic Front, although he had previously run for president under the United Party banner. He was supported by the outgoing president, Bakili Muluzi.

National Assembly
A total of 1,268 candidates ran in the election of which 373 were independents and the rest representing fifteen parties.

Seven parties contested the elections as the Mgwirizano Coalition; the Republican Party, the People's Progressive Movement, the Movement for Genuine Democratic Change, the People's Transformation Party, the Malawi Forum for Unity and Development, the National Unity Party and the Malawi Democratic Party.

Results

President

National Assembly
Polling in six constituencies was delayed due to printing errors on the ballot papers.

References

Presidential elections in Malawi
Elections in Malawi
Malawi
General
Malawi